Adventstid, or Adventstid kom till mitt ensamma hus, is a Swedish language 1972 Advent song, with lyrics and music by Carl Bertil Agnestig. The song has often been performed in Kindergarten and at school in Sweden during Advent.

Publication
Julens önskesångbok, 1997, under the lines "Advent".
Barnens svenska sångbok, 1999, under the lines "Året runt".

Recordings
An early recording was done by Kattarp-Välinge barnkör, and the record was released in 1979.

References

1972 songs
Swedish songs
Swedish-language songs
Advent songs